The Argus 50 hp aircraft engine, from 1909 was a four-cylinder, water cooled inline engine built by the German Argus Motoren company.

Design and development

The Argus 50 hp aircraft engine was developed by Argus Motoren around 1909 based upon their earlier balloon- and boat-engines.

The engine cylinders were of cast iron, cast in pairs of two cylinders, with the cooling jackets integral in the casting.
There were two side valves per cylinder, which were operated from the camshaft, which was located on one side of the engine block and driven from the crankshaft by spur gears.
The intake valves were oriented to the middle of each cylinder pair, and their intake ducts were conjoined within the casting into a single external port.
All four cylinders were fed by a single Cudell-G.A.-carburettor.

The coolant was circulated by a centrifugal water pump which was installed on the carburettor side and driven from the camshaft gear.
A single spark plug per cylinder was mounted above the inlet valve, with the magneto located at the control side of the engine, driven from the crankshaft via an intermediate spur gear.
There was no oil pump installed and the lubrication was done solely by splash.

Applications

Fokker Spin 1910 (first and second version)
Sikorsky S-5

Specifications

See also

References

Notes

Bibliography 

1900s aircraft piston engines
Argus aircraft engines